"First Kiss" is a song by American singer-songwriter Kid Rock from his tenth studio album, First Kiss (2015). Written by Kid Rock and Marlon Young, and produced by Kid Rock and Dann Huff, the song was first released to digital retailers on January 6, 2015 as the lead single from the album of the same name. The song recalls a man's first kiss with his high school sweetheart, who remains by his side to this day. Critics noted the song's inspiration from Bryan Adams' 1985 hit, "Summer of '69." Though both "First Kiss" and "Summer Of 69" use the same chord structure of 38 Special's "Hold On Loosely."

The song achieved moderate commercial success, being Kid Rock's first Billboard Hot 100 hit since "All Summer Long" in 2008 and so far reaching a peak position of 66 on that chart. A crossover success, "First Kiss" has impacted multiple pop and rock charts, and was later sent to country radio.

Track listings
Digital download – single
 First Kiss – 4:40

US CD single
 First Kiss – 4:40
 Jesus And Bocephus – 3:51
 Wasting Time  – 4:43

Chart performance

Weekly charts

Year-end charts

Release history

References

Songs about kissing
2014 songs
2015 singles
Warner Records singles
Songs written by Kid Rock
Kid Rock songs
Song recordings produced by Dann Huff